Vorobyovy Gory (lit. Sparrow Hills) is a Moscow Metro station. It is on the Sokolnicheskaya Line, between Universitet and Sportivnaya stations. Its name originates from a nearby elevated area literally translated as Sparrow Hills.

History

The bridge, which is known as the Luzhniki Metro Bridge, or simply "Metromost", and spans the Moskva River, was originally built in 1958. The architects for the project were M. P. Bubnov, A. S. Markelov, M. F. Markovsky, A. K. Ryzhkov, and B. I. Tkhor. The bridge, hastily built, was plagued by corrosion and seeping water and fell into disrepair. It was deemed structurally unsound by 1984, so the station (at the time called Leninskiye Gory) was "temporarily" closed for repairs and trains were rerouted to temporary bridges alongside. Eighteen years later on December 14, 2002, the newly renovated and renamed station was opened to the public once again.

Design
Built into the lower level of a bridge, it is unique in the city. At  in length, the platform is the longest in the system as the station needed to be accessible from both sides of the river. It is also the highest station above ground level at 15 metres (50 ft), though this is less remarkable since all but a handful of Metro stations are underground. Apart from its dimensions, Vorobyovy Gory is also notable in being the only Moscow Metro station with windows.

References

External links

Buildings and structures completed in 2002
Moscow Metro stations
Railway stations in Russia opened in 1959
Sokolnicheskaya Line
1959 establishments in the Soviet Union
Khamovniki District